The Flood (German:Sindflut) is a 1927 German silent film directed by and starring Josef Berger.

References

External links

1927 films
Films of the Weimar Republic
Films directed by Josef Berger
German silent feature films
German black-and-white films